Sakuramachi Station (桜町駅) is the name of two train stations in Japan:

Sakuramachi Station (Nagano)
 Sakuramachi Station (Nagasaki)